Kate Lord-Brennan is a Manx politician who has been a member of the House of Keys for the constituency of Glenfaba & Peel since the 2021 Manx general election. Prior to September 2021, Lord-Brennan served as a member of the  Legislative Council of the Isle of Man, having been elected in March 2018.

In October 2021 she was appointed by Chief Minister Alfred Cannan as Minister for the Cabinet Office.

References

Members of the Legislative Council of the Isle of Man
Members of the House of Keys 2021–2026
Manx women in politics
Year of birth missing (living people)
Living people
Place of birth missing (living people)